Ian Eric Kirkpatrick (born September 20, 1982) is an American record producer and songwriter based in Los Angeles. He has produced and written music for many high-profile artists such as Backstreet Boys, The Chainsmokers, Jason Derulo, Selena Gomez, Shakira, Nick Jonas, Justin Bieber, Britney Spears, Pitbull, Katy Perry, Dua Lipa, and many more.

Discography

Singles

Full discography

References

External links
This Is Noise Management 
Allmusic.com
Albumcredits.com

Living people
1982 births
Record producers from Los Angeles